EKM ekm may refer to:

 Art Museum of Estonia
 Elip language (ISO 639-3 code: ekm)
 Elkhart Municipal Airport (FAA LID code), in Indiana, US
 Evangelical Church in Central Germany